Woodsville High School, in Woodsville, New Hampshire, is a public secondary school located in the White Mountains of New Hampshire, serving the towns of Haverhill (including North Haverhill, East Haverhill, Woodsville, and Mountain Lakes), Bath, Warren, Piermont, and Benton.

The school is operated by School Administrative Unit 23.

References

External links

Educational institutions established in 1886
Schools in Grafton County, New Hampshire
Public high schools in New Hampshire
Haverhill, New Hampshire
1886 establishments in New Hampshire